George Price may refer to:

 George Price (footballer) (c. 1878–1938), footballer
 George Price (cartoonist) (1901–1995), American cartoonist
 George Cadle Price (1919–2011), prime minister of Belize
 George E. Price (1848–1938), member of the West Virginia Senate, 1885–1889
 George Edward Price (1842–1926), UK MP for Devonport
 George Lawrence Price (1892–1918), last soldier of the British Empire killed in combat during World War I
 George McCready Price (1870–1963), Canadian creationist
 George R. Price (1922–1975), US scientist, evolutionary theorist
 George W. Price, a self-emancipated slave and member of the North Carolina House and Senate